Juan Carlos Quintero Pérez (born February 20, 1978) is a Colombian football midfielder, who currently plays for Cúcuta Deportivo in the Copa Mustang.

Quintero played for Colombia at the 1993 FIFA World Youth Championship in Australia.

References

External links
Profile at GolGolGol.net

1978 births
Living people
Footballers from Bogotá
Colombian footballers
Footballers from Medellín
Colombia under-20 international footballers
Envigado F.C. players
Deportes Quindío footballers
Deportivo Pereira footballers
Atlético Bucaramanga footballers
Atlético Junior footballers
Millonarios F.C. players
Independiente Medellín footballers
Independiente Santa Fe footballers
Atlético Huila footballers
La Equidad footballers
Cúcuta Deportivo footballers
Association football midfielders